HMS Somerset is the name of four ships of the Royal Navy:
 , a third rate of 1698
 , a third rate of 1731
 , a third rate of 1748
 , a Type 23 frigate launched in 1994

Battle honours
Ships named Somerset have earned the following battle honours:
 Vigo 1702
 Velez Malaga 1704
 Louisburg 1758
 Quebec 1759

Royal Navy ship names